The following is a list of events relating to television in Ireland from 1994.

Events
3 January – US animated television series Animaniacs begins on Network 2. 
19 January – The Minister for Arts, Culture and the Gaeltacht, Michael D. Higgins repeals Section 31 of the Broadcasting Authority Act.
10 March – The first ever rerun of the British children's  television series Postman Pat screens on Network 2 for the very last time. The series will be repeated again on 10 December 1996.
22 March – Long running award winning UK television series for preschoolers Tots TV gets set to air on Network 2.
9 April – After three months of airing on the BBC in Great Britain, the second series of the British children's animated television series The Animals of Farthing Wood screens in Ireland for the first time with the series translated into an Irish language once again. The second series begins it first ever Irish airing on RTÉ1.
30 April – Ireland hosts the Eurovision Song Contest, and wins for the third year in succession. The event is presented by Gerry Ryan and Cynthia Ní Mhurchú from Dublin's Point Theatre, and the winning song is Rock 'n' Roll Kids, composed by Brendan Graham, and performed by Paul Harrington and Charlie McGettigan. "Riverdance" by Bill Whelan is introduced as the interval act, and goes on to achieve international success.
7 May – Australian cartoon series about a koala named Blinky Bill begins on Network 2.
10 May – The original 1970s Mr. Men animated series returns to Irish television after a long absence as it goes to air on Network 2 with the network's long running children's block The Den airing only the first three episodes before its summer break.
20 May – The RTÉ People in Need Telethon 1994 is broadcast live from RTÉ One with Gay Byrne introducing the opening segment.
15 July – The very first Irish screening of renowned Australian children's television series Bananas in Pyjamas is transmitted on Network 2.
18 July – Glenroe comes to Australia with SBS broadcasting the series.
22 July – The second in the Mr. Men television series trilogy Little Miss begins on Network 2. This event introduces the Mr. Men's female cousins to Irish television for the very first time ever.
31 August – The IRA announces a ceasefire, sending the announcement to the RTÉ Newsroom on cassette, and by way of a written message which gives details on the ceasefire.
13 September – US sitcom Frasier is launched on Network 2.
14 September – The Welsh children's stop-motion series Joshua Jones from Bumper Films (the animation company behind Fireman Sam and Rocky Hollow)  is broadcast on Network 2 as part of The Den. Fireman Sam won't return to Irish television until 2000 (although viewers who have access to the BBC and various British television channels were to see earlier transmissions of the series).
16 September – A model animated series for children from Australia called Ferry Boat Fred is broadcast on Network 2, airing as the first programme on The Den.
17 November – Bertie Ahern is appointed Tánaiste and Minister for Arts, Culture and the Gaeltacht with responsibility for broadcasting.
15 December – Michael D. Higgins is re-appointed Minister for Arts, Culture and the Gaeltacht with responsibility for broadcasting.

Debuts

RTÉ One
8 January –  Red Fox (1991)
29 March – 50,000 Secret Journeys (1994)
10 April –  The Devil and Daniel Mouse (1978)
8 May – Family (1994)
28 May –  The Odyssey (1992–1994)
27 June –  Love Hurts (1992–1994)
9 July –  The Busy World of Richard Scarry (1994–1997)
30 July –  Winnetka Road (1994)
30 July –  Rupert (1991–1997)
6 November –  ER (1994–2009)
26 December –  Enchanted Tales (1990–2000)

Network 2
3 January –  Animaniacs (1993–1998)
5 January –  The New Adventures of Speed Racer (1993)
5 January –  Papa Beaver's Storytime (1993–1994)
6 January –  Marlin Bay (1992–1994)
12 January –  Dog City (1992–1994)
5 February –  The Adventures of Brisco County, Jr. (1993–1994)
22 March –  Tots TV (1993–1998)
24 March –  Lois & Clark: The New Adventures of Superman (1993–1997)
7 April – Megazone (1994–1995)
13 April –  Scooby, Scrappy and Yabba-Doo (1982)
16 April –  The World of Peter Rabbit and Friends (1992–1995)
27 April –  Simon and the Witch (1987–1988)
29 April –  Doug (1991–1994)
7 May –  The Adventures of Blinky Bill (1994)
9 May –  The Adventures of Teddy Ruxpin (1986–1987)
12 May –  Around the World in Eighty Days (1972–1973)
25 June –  2 Stupid Dogs (1993–1995)
8 July –  The Wild Puffalumps (1988)
15 July –  Bananas in Pyjamas (1992–2001)
22 July –  Little Miss (1983)
18 August –  Broomstick Cottage (1989)
September – Echo Island (1994–1999)
12 September –  Adventures of Sonic the Hedgehog (1993)
13 September –  Frasier (1993–2004)
14 September –  Joshua Jones (1992)
16 September –  Moonacre (1994)
16 September –  Ferry Boat Fred (1992)
1 October – The Swamp (1994–1996)
3 October –  Jeeves and Wooster (1990–1993)
5 October –  Dinobabies (1994–1995)
10 October –  Fourways Farm (1993–1996)
24 October –  Are You Afraid of the Dark? (1990–1996, 1999–2000)
12 December –  Sonic the Hedgehog (1993–1994)
24 December –  The Poky Little Puppy's Christmas (1992)
24 December –  Wild West C.O.W.-Boys of Moo Mesa (1992–1993)
25 December –  The Bears Who Saved Christmas (1994)
25 December –  A Flintstone Family Christmas (1993)
25 December –  Mole's Christmas (1994)
Undated –  The Girl from Tomorrow Part II: Tomorrow's End (1993)

Changes of network affiliation

Ongoing television programmes

1960s
RTÉ News: Nine O'Clock (1961–present)
RTÉ News: Six One (1962–present)
The Late Late Show (1962–present)

1970s
Sports Stadium (1973–1997)
The Late Late Toy Show (1975–present)
RTÉ News on Two (1978–2014)
Bosco (1979–1996)
The Sunday Game (1979–present)

1980s
Mailbag (1982–1996)
Glenroe (1983–2001)
Live at 3 (1986–1997)
Saturday Live (1986–1999)
Questions and Answers (1986–2009)
Dempsey's Den (1986–2010)
Marketplace (1987–1996)
Where in the World? (1987–1996)
Know Your Sport (1987–1998)
Kenny Live (1988–1999)
Fair City (1989–present)
RTÉ News: One O'Clock (1989–present)

1990s
Would You Believe (1990s–present)
Winning Streak (1990–present)
Blackboard Jungle (1991–1997)
Challenging Times (1991–2001)
Prime Time (1992–present)
The Movie Show (1993–2001)
No Disco (1993–2003)

Ending this year
1 April – Ryantown (1993–1994)
3 April - School Around the Corner (1990-1994) moved to UTV instead from 1995.
9 April - Play The Game
29 May – Family (1994)
Undated
Bibi & Mail Bag

Births
12 April – Saoirse Ronan, film and television actress

See also
1994 in Ireland

References

 
1990s in Irish television